Maid o' the Storm is a 1918 American silent drama film directed by Raymond B. West and starring Bessie Barriscale, George Fisher and Herschel Mayall. The film takes place in Scotland and London.

Cast
 Bessie Barriscale as Ariel
 George Fisher as Franklin Shirley
 Herschel Mayall as Abe Strohman
 Joseph J. Dowling as Andy MacTavish
 Myra Davis as Mrs. MacTavish
 Nick Cogley as Peter Winkenmulder
 Howard Hickman as Jules Picardo 
 Jacob Abrams as Joseah Dods
 Ida Lewis as Serafina Dods
 Helen Dunbar as Mrs. Wellington Shackleford
 Lois Wilson as Elaine Shackleford
 Pietro Buzzi as Professor Duval
 Clifford Alexander as Richard Burrows
 Nona Thomas as Witch

References

Bibliography
 Paul C. Spehr & Gunnar Lundquist. American Film Personnel and Company Credits, 1908-1920. McFarland, 1996.

External links
 

1918 films
1918 drama films
1910s English-language films
American silent feature films
Silent American drama films
American black-and-white films
Films directed by Raymond B. West
Films distributed by W. W. Hodkinson Corporation
Films set in London
Films set in Scotland
1910s American films